Li Wenjun (8 December 1930 – 27 January 2023) was a Chinese translator and writer of prose. Li served as the vice chairman of Translators Association of China and as the director of the Literature and Art Translation Committee. He was also a researcher at the Chinese Academy of Social Sciences.

Li was one of the main translators of the works of the American novelists William Faulkner and Frances Hodgson Burnett into Chinese. For his contributions to the introduction of American literature to foreign readers, he was honored with the Sino-US Literature Exchange Award in 1994.

Biography
Li was born in Zhongshan, Guangdong on 8 December 1930. He graduated from Fudan University in 1952, where he majored in journalism at the Department of Journalism. After graduation, Li began to publish his works, and worked in World Literature (《》) as an editor. In 1979, Li joined the China Writers Association.

Death
Li died on 27 January 2023, at age 92.

Translations
 The Sound and the Fury
 As I Lay Dying
 Go Down, Moses
 Absalom, Absalom!
 Little Lord Fauntleroy (Frances Hodgson Burnett)
 A Little Princess (Frances Hodgson Burnett)
 The Secret Garden (Frances Hodgson Burnett)
 The Metamorphosis (Franz Kafka)
 The Ballad of the Sad Café (Carson Mccullers)

Works
 William Faulkner
 A Brief History of American Literature
 Woman and The Gallery
 Zonglangdahuaji
 Seeking, finding

Personal life
Li married Zhang Peifen, also a translator.

Award
 Sino-US Literature Exchange Award (1994)
 TAC's Lifetime Achievement Award in Translation (2014)

References

1930 births
2023 deaths
20th-century Chinese translators
21st-century Chinese translators
English–Chinese translators
Fudan University alumni
People from Zhongshan
People's Republic of China translators